Iwan Otto "Pietje" Fränkel (19 January 1941 – 6 December 2019), was a Surinamese International football player who has played for Transvaal in the Hoofdklasse, Blauw-Wit in the Dutch Eredivisie, Schwarz-Weiß Essen in the Regionalliga West in West Germany, Royal Antwerp F.C. in the Belgian Eerste Klasse and for SC Amersfoort in the Dutch Eerste Divisie.

Career

SV Transvaal
Born 19 January 1941 in Paramaribo, Surinam, Fränkel began his career on the Mr. Bronsplein from where he joined the youth ranks of S.V. Transvaal, one of the stronger clubs from the capital at the time. He made his debut for the first team in 1960, and two seasons later helped the club to their sixth national championship. He then relocated to the Netherlands to play professionally for Blauw-Wit Amsterdam in the Dutch Eredivisie.

FC Blauw-Wit
In 1962 Fränkel emigrated to the Netherlands to play professional football in the newly formed Eredivisie, joining FC Blauw-Wit, helping them to a third place finish in his first season with the club. Playing at the Olympic Stadium in Amsterdam, he would become one of Suriname's earliest footballing exports, following in the footsteps of Herman Rijkaard who had joined Blauw-Wit from Robinhood a couple of years before him.

ETB Schwarz-Weiß
In 1964 Fränkel moved to Essen, West Germany joining ETB Schwarz-Weiß competing in the German Regionalliga West for two seasons before joining Royal Antwerp F.C. in Belgium.

Royal Antwerp FC
In 1966 Fränkel joined Royal Antwerp F.C. from Antwerp, Belgium competing in the Belgian Eerste Klasse, the top flight of football in Belgium. He played five seasons for the club, amassing 109 regular season caps, while scoring 23 goals. Participating in the Intertoto Cup of 1966 and 1968, where the team played against Union Luxembourg, Kilmarnock FC and Göztepe Izmir with a second round exit yielding the best result in the 1966/67 edition. Having been relegated to the Tweede Klasse, he helped Royal Antwerp to promote back to the top flight before parting ways with the club.

SC Amersfoort
Fränkel then played in the Dutch Eerste Divisie, the 2nd tier of professional football in the Netherlands, for SC Amersfoort before retiring as a player.

International career

Suriname
Fränkel played for the National team of Suriname receiving one call up, playing against the Netherlands in a 4–3 loss at the National Stadion in Paramaribo on 3 July 1960, before he relocated to the Netherlands.

Personal life
Fränkel is the father of Suriname International footballer Ray Fränkel and the uncle of Purrel Fränkel who also played professionally in the Netherlands
.

Honours

Club
S.V. Transvaal
 SVB Hoofdklasse (1): 1962

References 

2019 deaths
1941 births
Sportspeople from Paramaribo
Surinamese footballers
Suriname international footballers
S.V. Transvaal players
Blauw-Wit Amsterdam players
Royal Antwerp F.C. players
SVB Eerste Divisie players
Eredivisie players
Eerste Divisie players
Belgian Pro League players
Expatriate footballers in Belgium
Expatriate footballers in West Germany
Expatriate footballers in the Netherlands
Surinamese expatriate footballers
Surinamese expatriate sportspeople in Belgium
Surinamese expatriate sportspeople in West Germany
Surinamese expatriate sportspeople in the Netherlands
Surinamese emigrants to the Netherlands
Association football midfielders